Werbung, baby! is a 1998 album by the Finnish group Eläkeläiset.  It consists of humppa cover versions or remixes of popular songs.

Track listing 
Original artist and song in parentheses.

 Hump (Van Halen - Jump) - 2.27
 Humppakonehumppa (Meredith Brooks - Bitch) - 3.15
 Humppamedia (Kent - Om du var här) - 3.09
 Punakka humppa (Aerosmith - Pink) - 2.34
 Peljätty humppa (Carl Douglas - Kung-Fu Fighting) - 2.23
 Humpan alla (Red Hot Chili Peppers - Under The Bridge) - 2.58
 Humppaa, saatanat! (Spencer Davis Group - Gimme Some Lovin') - 2.17
 Kuusessa hevon (Eric Clapton - Tears In Heaven) - 2.37
 Lierohumppa (Elvis Presley - Suspicious Minds) - 2.29
 Paratiisihumppa (Stevie Wonder - Pastime Paradise) - 3.07
 Humppatarzan (Foo Fighters - Monkeywrench) - 2.04
 Poltettu humppa (Midnight Oil - Beds Are Burning) - 3.23
 Humppauhraus (Kiss - I Love It Loud) - 3.03
 Humppakummitus (Chumbawamba - Homophobia) - 2.35
 Humppabarbi (Aqua - Barbie Girl) - 2.10
 Tervetuloa mehtään (Guns N' Roses - Welcome to the Jungle) - 2.08
 Hotelli Helpotus (The Eagles - Hotel California) - 4.04
 Humppaan itsekseni (Billy Idol - Dancing With Myself) - 4.03

References 

The official home page of Eläkeläiset
Russian Eläkeläiset fanclub
Texts from this album

1999 compilation albums
Eläkeläiset albums